Takin' It All Off is a 1987 straight-to-video release from Ed Hansen and Robert T.Gervasoni's Hansen / Gervasoni productions company, and provided a quick sequel to Hansen and Gervasoni's popular 1985 feature Takin' It Off. The cast includes Kitten Natividad, cult actor George 'Buck' Flower, adult actress Jean Poremba and the British glamour model Gail Harris.

Plot 
A school for striptease artists  is in financial trouble. The students audition for the owner of the Chez Bob A Ree Bob, a renowned strip club, except the glamorous newcomer, Allison, cannot bring herself to take her clothes off in public. Veteran stripper Betty Big Ones suggests hypnotism, and although this helps Allison to shed her shyness, and her clothes, it has the unfortunate side-effect of making her strip whenever she hears the film's theme song - which, as you might expect, gets played everywhere.

Cast
 Kitten Natividad as Betty Big Ones
 Candie Evans as Allison
 Farley Maynard as Murray
 Becky LeBeau as Becky

External links 

1987 films
1987 comedy films
1987 direct-to-video films
1980s English-language films
American comedy films
American direct-to-video films
Direct-to-video comedy films